Maria Carmela Brosas (born 15 July 1975), better known by her screen name K Brosas, is a Filipina actress, comedian, singer and television host. She was born in the Philippines to an American father and a Filipina mother and was a band member of Gladys and the Boxers and was lead singer when the group performed as K and the Boxers with Music Director Samuel Cruz Valdecantos, Bassist Nolit Abanilla, Drummer Solomon Valdecantos and Guitarist Eric Tuazon. In mid-2010, she became a co-host in the game show Pilipinas Win na Win.

Biography

Early life
Brosas was born in Borongan, Eastern Samar to a Filipino mother and an American father, whom she never knew. At a young age, her family transferred to Manila. She finished high school at St. Paul University Quezon City where she enrolled in an undergraduate B.S. Tourism course.

Personal life
Brosas' only daughter, Crystal, came out as lesbian in July 2020. Her daughter currently lives with her girlfriend, Pola Anne, which Brosas fully supports.

Filmography

Television

Film

References

External links
 
 K Brosas on Twitter
 
 Website of K Brosas (WaPak!)

1975 births
Living people
21st-century Filipino actresses
Filipino women comedians
Filipino film actresses
Filipino people of American descent
Filipino television actresses
Filipino television variety show hosts
People from Borongan
21st-century Filipino women singers
GMA Network personalities
ABS-CBN personalities
TV5 (Philippine TV network) personalities